is a common feminine Japanese given name which is occasionally used by males. It is also a short name for Naoko, Naomi, Naoto, etc.

Possible writings
Nao can be written using different kanji characters and can mean:
直, "honest"
尚, "esteem"
巨, "giant"
奈緒, "Nara, cord"
菜緒, "greens, cord"
奈央, "Nara, center"
The name can also be written in hiragana or katakana.

People

Nao (ナオ), a drummer from Visual Kei band Alice Nine
Nao (born 1985), Japanese singer and former lead singer of the band fripSide
Nao Deguchi (なお, 1837-1918), founder of Oomoto
Nao Eguchi (江口 直生, born 1992), Japanese footballer
Nao Furuhata (奈和, born 1996), member of the girl group SKE48
Nao Hibino (菜緒, born 1994), Japanese pro tennis player
Nao Higashihama (東浜 巨, born 1993 ), Japanese baseball pitcher
, Japanese male swimmer
Nao Kawakita (奈緒, born 1975), drummer and backup vocalist of Japanese rock band Maximum the Hormone
Nao Kodaira (奈緒, born 1986), Japanese Olympic long-track speed skater
Nao Kosaka (菜緒, born 2002), Japanese idol, model, actress and member of the girl group Hinatazaka46
Nao Matsushita (奈緒, born 1985), Japanese actress and pianist
Nao Nagasawa (奈央, born 1984), Japanese actress, singer and model
Nao Oikawa (奈央, born 1981), Japanese AV idol and tarento
Nao Ōmori (南朋, born 1972), Japanese actor
Nao Saejima (奈緒, 1968–2013), Japanese AV idol
, Japanese cyclist
Nao Takamori (奈緒, born 1973), Japanese voice idol
Nao Takasugi (1922–2009), Japanese-American politician
Nao Tamura, a Japanese voice actress
Nao Tōyama (奈央, born 1992), a Japanese pop solo artist and former leader of Buzy (band)
Nao Ueki (南央, born 1997), member of the girl group HKT48.  Often referred to as Chinkansen
, Japanese singer
 Nao Yasuda (奈央, born 1990), former member of Kamen Rider Girls
Nao Yazawa (直), Japanese manga artist

Characters

Nao, a character in the manga series Inu Neko Jump!
Nao Chikura (名央), a character in the manga series Hatsukoi Limited
Nao Egokoro (菜緒), a character from the visual novel Your Turn to Die
Nao Kamiya (奈緒), a character in the mobile game and anime The Idolmaster Cinderella Girls
Nao Kanzaki (ナオ), the main protagonist in the manga and live actions series, Liar Game
Nao Makinoha (奈緒), a character from the shōnen fantasy manga Midori No Hibi
Nao Mariota Pryderi, a female character in the MMORPG Mabinogi
Nao Midorikawa, a character in Smile PreCure!, the 9th season in the Pretty Cure franchise
Nao Morisaki (七央), a character from the erotic visual novel Soul Link
Nao Okuda (直), a character in the manga series K-On!
Nao Tomori (奈緒), a character in the anime series Charlotte
Nao Yasumori (奈緒), a female character in the anime and manga series Shiki (novel series)
Nao Yuuki (奈緒), a female character in the anime series My-HiME
Nao Yoshikawa (菜緒), the main character in the manga and live action series Good Morning Call

Japanese feminine given names
Japanese unisex given names